Walter "Rev" Cannady (March 6, 1904 - December 3, 1981) was an American baseball infielder in the Negro leagues. He played from 1921 to 1945 with several teams. He also managed the New York Black Yankees in 1938.

References

External links
 and Baseball-Reference Black Baseball stats and Seamheads
 

1904 births
Baseball players from Florida
People from Lake City, Florida
Baseball infielders
Chicago American Giants players
Cincinnati Clowns players
Cleveland Tate Stars players
Harrisburg Giants players
Hilldale Club players
Homestead Grays players
New York Black Yankees players
New York Cubans players
Lincoln Giants players
Pittsburgh Crawfords players
Negro league baseball managers
1981 deaths
20th-century African-American sportspeople